Hebrus consolidus is a species of velvet water bug in the family Hebridae. It is found in the Caribbean Sea, Central America, and North America.

References

Further reading

 

Articles created by Qbugbot
Insects described in 1894
Hebroidea
Hemiptera of North America
Hemiptera of Central America